The glucagon-like peptide receptors (GLPRs) include the following two receptors:

 Glucagon-like peptide 1 receptor (GLP-1R) – binds glucagon-like peptide 1 (GLP-1)
 Glucagon-like peptide 2 receptor (GLP-2R) – binds glucagon-like peptide 2 (GLP-2)

See also
 Glucagon receptor

References

G protein-coupled receptors